Field Marshal Hugh Gough, 1st Viscount Gough,  (3 November 1779 – 2 March 1869) was an Irish officer of the British Army. After serving as a junior officer at the seizure of the Cape of Good Hope during the French Revolutionary Wars, Gough commanded the 2nd Battalion of the 87th (Royal Irish Fusiliers) Regiment of Foot during the Peninsular War. After serving as commander-in-chief of the British forces in China during the First Opium War, he became Commander-in-Chief, India and led the British forces in action against the Marathas defeating them decisively at the conclusion of the Gwalior campaign and then commanded the troops that defeated the Sikhs during both the First Anglo-Sikh War and the Second Anglo-Sikh War.

Early career
Born the son of Lieutenant Colonel George Gough and Letitia Gough (née Bunbury) of Lisnavagh, Gough was commissioned into the Limerick Militia on 7 August 1793. He transferred to a locally raised regiment on 7 August 1794 and, having been promoted to lieutenant in the 119th Regiment of Foot on 11 October 1794, transferred to the 78th (Highlanders) Regiment of Foot on 6 June 1795. He took part in the capture of the Cape of Good Hope in September 1795 during the French Revolutionary Wars and transferred to the 87th (Royal Irish Fusiliers) Regiment of Foot in December 1795, before being deployed with his regiment in the West Indies and taking part in the expedition to Dutch Guiana in 1799. After returning to England he was promoted to captain in the 2nd Battalion of his regiment on 25 June 1803 and to major in the same battalion on 25 June 1803.

Peninsular War
Gough joined Sir Arthur Wellesley in Spain in January 1809 and commanded the 2nd Battalion of his regiment at the Battle of Talavera, during which he was wounded in July 1809 during the Peninsular War. He also fought at the Battle of Barrosa, where his regiment captured a French Imperial Eagle in March 1811. Promoted to brevet lieutenant colonel on 30 March 1811, he also took part in the Siege of Tarifa in January 1812, the Battle of Vitoria in June 1813 and the Battle of Nivelle, during which he was again badly wounded in November 1813. He was promoted to the substantive rank of lieutenant colonel on 25 May 1815, appointed a Companion of the Order of the Bath on 4 June 1815 and appointed a Knight Bachelor on 16 March 1816.

Promoted to colonel on 12 August 1819, Gough became commanding officer of the 22nd Regiment of Foot in County Tipperary where he also served as a local magistrate. He was promoted to major general on 22 July 1830 and advanced to Knight Commander of the Order of the Bath on 18 September 1831.

Service in the east

Gough became General Officer Commanding the Mysore division of the Madras Army in 1837. At the outset of the First Opium War in March 1839 he was appointed commander-in-chief of the British forces in China. He led the assault at the Battle of Canton in May 1841, and having been promoted to the local rank of lieutenant general in India and in China on 18 June 1841, he also led the assault at the Battle of Amoy in August 1841. Advanced to Knight Grand Cross of the Order of the Bath on 14 October 1841 and promoted to the substantive rank of lieutenant general on 23 November 1841, he commanded the British forces at the Battle of Chapu in May 1842 and at the Battle of Chinkiang in July 1842. After the Treaty of Nanking, the British forces were withdrawn and he returned to India. He became a baronet on 1 December 1842 and was promoted to the local rank of full general in India on 3 March 1843.

In August 1843 Gough became Commander-in-Chief, India, and in December 1843 he led the British forces in action against the Mahrattas defeating them decisively at the conclusion of the Gwalior campaign. He also commanded the troops at the Battle of Mudki in December 1845, at the Battle of Ferozeshah also in December 1845 and at the Battle of Sobraon in February 1846 during the First Anglo-Sikh War. Gough was loyally supported by Lord Hardinge, the governor-general, who served under him during these actions. Gough was elevated to the peerage as Baron Gough of Chinkiang in China and of Maharajpore and the Sutlej in the East Indies on 7 April 1846.

The Second Anglo-Sikh War started in 1848, and again Gough took to the field commanding in person at the Battle of Ramnagar in November 1848 and at the Battle of Chillianwala in January 1849. He was criticised for relying on frontal assault by infantry rather than using artillery and was replaced as commander-in-chief by Sir Charles Napier but, before news of his replacement had arrived, Gough achieved a decisive victory over the Sikhs in the Battle of Gujarat in February 1849. He returned to Ireland and was advanced in the peerage as Viscount Gough of Goojerat in the Punjab and of the City of Limerick on 4 June 1849. He retired from active service later that year and was promoted to the substantive rank of full general on 20 June 1854.

Gough also served as colonel of the 99th Regiment of Foot, as colonel of the 87th (Royal Irish Fusiliers) Regiment of Foot and later as colonel of the Royal Horse Guards. In Dublin, he was a member of the Kildare Street Club. He was promoted to field marshal on 9 November 1862.

Death and commemoration

He died at St. Helen's, his home in Booterstown, on 2 March 1869 and was buried in Stillorgan.

Proposals for a statue to Gough began in 1869 but were rejected by Dublin Corporation, including sites in Carlisle Bridge, Foster Place and Westmoreland Street. An equestrian statue of Gough by John Foley was ultimately erected outside the city, in Dublin's Phoenix Park in 1880 but, after being repeatedly vandalised in the 1940s and 1950s, it was moved to Chillingham Castle in Northumberland in 1990. The inscription reads:

In honour of Field Marshal Hugh Viscount Gough, K.P., G.C.B., G.C.S.I., an illustrious Irishman, whose achievements in the Peninsular War, in China, and in India, have added lustre to the military glory of his country, which he faithfully served for seventy five years. This statue [cast from cannon taken by troops under his command and granted by Parliament for the purpose] is erected by friends and comrades.

The cannon referred to were captured by Gough in China and India and yielded 15 tons of gun-metal for the statue.

Family
In June 1807, Gough married Frances Maria Stephens, daughter of General Edward Stephens.

As the 1st Viscount Gough, he set down a family seat near Gort at Lough Cutra Castle, County Galway, Ireland, when purchased by him in 1852.

Gough's first cousins included Thomas Bunbury of Lisnavagh, County Carlow, MP for Carlow, and Jane McClintock of Drumcar, mother of the 1st Baron Rathdonnell.

Arms

References

Sources

Further reading

External links

 

|-

|-

|-

|-

1779 births
1869 deaths
Military personnel from County Limerick
British Army personnel of the Napoleonic Wars
British Commanders-in-Chief of India
British field marshals
British military personnel of the First Anglo-Sikh War
British military personnel of the First Opium War
British military personnel of the Gwalior Campaign
British military personnel of the Second Anglo-Sikh War
Knights Grand Cross of the Order of the Bath
Knights Grand Commander of the Order of the Star of India
Knights of St Patrick
Royal Horse Guards officers
1
87th (Royal Irish Fusiliers) Regiment of Foot officers
Knights Bachelor
Members of the Privy Council of the United Kingdom
Recipients of the Army Gold Cross
Irish knights
Peers of the United Kingdom created by Queen Victoria